Thibang Sindile Theophilus Phete (born 4 April 1994), known as Cafu Phete is a South African professional soccer player who plays as a defender for Emirati club Al Bataeh and South African national team. He started his career at the Stars of Africa Football Academy.

Club career

Early career
Born in Kimberley, South Africa, Phete began his career in the National First Division with Cape Town-based club Milano United, having previously graduated from the Stars of Africa Academy. In 2014, he joined Segunda Divisão Portuguesa side Tourizense with whom he spent one season.

Vitória Guimarães
On 13 August 2015, Primeira Liga side Vitória Guimarães announced the signing of Phete from Tourizense. He made his debut for the club on 28 November in a 2–1 win over Boavista during which he was booked in the 29th minute before being substituted at half-time for Otávio. He made 12 appearances over the course of the season as Vitória ended in ninth spot on the Primeira Liga table. At the end of the season Phete was joined at the club by fellow countrymen Bongani Zungu and Haashim Domingo who had signed for the upcoming season. He failed to appear for the senior side in the following two seasons, however, after he was moved to the club's reserve squad, Vitória Guimarães B.

Famalicão
In June 2019, Phete left Guimarães to sign for fellow Primeira Liga side Famalicão on a three-year deal.

International career
He made his international debut for South Africa on 8 October 2020 in a 1–1 draw with Namibia.

Career statistics

References

External links

1994 births
Living people
South African soccer players
South Africa international soccer players
Association football defenders
Primeira Liga players
Liga Portugal 2 players
Segunda Divisão players
National First Division players
UAE Pro League players
Milano United F.C. players
G.D. Tourizense players
Vitória S.C. players
Vitória S.C. B players
F.C. Famalicão players
Al Bataeh Club players
Sportspeople from Kimberley, Northern Cape
South African expatriate soccer players
Expatriate footballers in Portugal
Expatriate footballers in the United Arab Emirates
South African expatriate sportspeople in Portugal
South African expatriate sportspeople in the United Arab Emirates
Belenenses SAD players